Events in the year 1746 in Norway.

Incumbents
Monarch: Christian VI (until 6 August); then Frederick V

Events

Arts and literature

Births

29 October – Claus Fasting, playwright, literary critic, editor and civil servant (died 1791).
15 November – Frants Philip Hopstock, priest (died 1824).
22 November – Bernt Anker, merchant, chamberlain and playwright (died 1805).

Deaths

See also

References